What's the Word is the second studio album by the Austin, Texas-based blues band The Fabulous Thunderbirds, released in 1980. Like its predecessor, the album initially sold poorly, but is now regarded as a successful white blues recording. The 2000 CD reissue on Benchmark Records contains three bonus tracks, two of which were recorded live at Club Koda, Austin, Texas.

Track listing 
All tracks composed by Kim Wilson; except where indicated
 "Runnin' Shoes" (Traditional, Juke Boy Bonner) – 3:38
 "You Ain't Nothin' But Fine" (Sidney Simien, Floyd Soileau) – 1:48 
 "Low-Down Woman" – 3:15
 "Extra Jimmies" (Jimmie Vaughan, Keith Ferguson) – 2:35
 "Sugar Coated Love" (Audrey Butler, J.D. Miller) – 3:00 
 "Last Call For Alcohol" (Vaughan, Kim Wilson) – 2:55
 "The Crawl" (Raymond Victoria, Wayne Shuler) – 2:15
 "Jumpin Bad" (Vaughan, Wilson) – 2:25
 "Learn To Treat Me Right" – 3:07
 "I'm A Good Man (If You Give Me A Chance)" – 2:50
 "Dirty Work" – 3:00
 "That's Enough of That Stuff" – 2:05

Bonus tracks on some editions
 "Band Introduction by C-Boy" – 0:21
 "Bad Boy" (Live) (Eddie Taylor) – 3:11
 "Scratch My Back" (Live) (James Moore) – 5:06
 "Los Fabulosos Thunderbirds" (Vaughan, Ferguson, Wilson) – 1:10
 "Los Fabulosos Thunderbirds" is track 13 on some earlier Chrysalis releases.

Personnel

Musicians
Kim Wilson – vocals, harmonica, simultaneous drums and harp on "Los Fabulosos Thunderbirds"
Jimmie Vaughan – guitar
Keith Ferguson – bass
Fran Christina – drums (tracks 2, 4, 6, 8-10, 12) percussion on "Los Fabulosos Thunderbirds"
Mike Buck –  drums (tracks 1, 3, 5, 7, 11)

Technical
 Denny Bruce – producer
 Bob Sullivan – engineer
 Frank DeLuna – mastering

References

External links
Official Site

1980 albums
The Fabulous Thunderbirds albums
Albums produced by Denny Bruce
Chrysalis Records albums